Kevin Bell (born September 12, 1971), professionally known as DJ Head, is a three-time Grammy Award winning hip-hop producer and DJ from Detroit, Michigan. He's best known for producing and co-producing songs for Eminem, Xzibit, Jay-Z, D12, Valid, Obie Trice, Bizarre, and as Eminem's original touring deejay from 1997 to 2002.

Early life 
Kevin Bell was raised in Detroit, attended Gesu Elementary School and is a graduate of Shrine Catholic High School in Royal Oak, Michigan (class of 1989), and is a Michigan State University alumni (Bachelor of Science, Engineering 1994). He also attended the Detroit Community Music School, studying Classical and Jazz Piano (1978–1989).

While working for a radio station, he and Proof released 3 versions of his W.E.G.O. mixtape series from 1993 to 1996.

Television 
His television appearances include: Saturday Night Live (w/ Eminem), MTV Spring Break (w/ Eminem, Xzibit, Dr. Dre), Top of the Pops (w/ Eminem, Dido), Grammy Awards (w/ Eminem), EMA's (w/ Eminem), and Multiple national and International tours. He appeared in the 8 Mile film, as the DJ for the rap battle scenes, inspired by the real life Saturday afternoon emcee battles at Maurice Malone's Hip Hop Shop in Detroit. In a recent round table discussion on Shade 45, DJ Head was credited by Eminem for introducing him to the music of 50 Cent, via a mix tape the DJ purchased by chance on the street in New York City. This led to 50 Cent later being signed to a multimillion-dollar recording contract with Shady, Aftermath, and Interscope Records.

Production discography 
Albums
Eminem - Infinite (1996)
Eminem - The Slim Shady LP (1999)
Eminem - The Marshall Mathers LP (2000)
D12 - Devil's Night (2001)
Eminem - The Eminem Show (2002)

Extended plays
D12 - The Underground E.P. (1997)
Eminem - Slim Shady EP (1997)
Bizarre - Attack of the Weirdos (1998)

Tracks
Funkmaster Flex & Big Kap - The Tunnel (1999)
"Intro" (feat. Pain In Da Ass)
Funkmaster Flex - 60 Minutes of Funk, Volume 4, The Mix Tape (2000) / Devil's Night (Deluxe Edition) (2001)
"Words Are Weapons"
Xzibit - Restless (2000)
"Don't Approach Me" (feat. Eminem)
Jay-Z - The Blueprint (2001) / Curtain Call (Deluxe Edition) (2005)
"Renegade" (feat. Eminem)
Bones soundtrack (2001) / Devil's Night (Deluxe Edition) (2001)
"These Drugs" (D12)

References
DJ Head production discography

External links

Eminem
1971 births
American DJs
Living people
Shady Records artists
Midwest hip hop musicians
Michigan State University alumni
American hip hop record producers
African-American record producers